Dead New World is the fifth studio album by American heavy metal band Ill Niño. The album was released on October 25, 2010, through Victory Records.

Album information
The album was self-produced, with co-production coming from Clint Lowery (guitarist for Sevendust) and Sahaj Ticotin, and mixed by Eddie Wohl (36 Crazyfists, Anthrax, Smile Empty Soul). The album artwork was created by Tim Butler of XIII Designs (Disturbed, Slipknot, Metallica, Slayer, Michael Jackson).

This is their first album to be released from Victory Records and it is also their first album not to feature profanity.

On June 2, 2010, Ill Niño released a brand new track, "Scarred (My Prison)", as a teaser for the new album.

The first single "Against The Wall" was available October 12 for download and a video was filmed.
This video was released on November 23.

The second single and music video "Bleed Like You" had its world premiere on February 11, while being featured in the 66th Episode of VicTorV (Victory Records TV), hosted by Ill Niño themselves.

Reception

The album sold around 3,000 copies in its first week and debuted at #164 on the US Billboard 200. However, the album briefly reached the top 20 of the rock album chart on iTunes.

Track listing

Personnel 
 Cristian Machado - vocals
 Dave Chavarri - drums
 Diego Verduzco - rhythm guitar
 Ahrue Luster - lead guitar
 Lazaro Pina - bass
 Daniel Couto - percussion

References

2010 albums
Ill Niño albums
Victory Records albums